Giancarlo Rebizzi (born October 5, 1933 in Milan) is a retired Italian professional football player.

Honours
 Serie B top scorer: 1954/55 (14 goals).

1933 births
Living people
Italian footballers
Serie A players
A.C. Legnano players
Brescia Calcio players
Inter Milan players
S.S.C. Bari players
Mantova 1911 players
U.S. Triestina Calcio 1918 players
S.S. Akragas Città dei Templi players
Association football forwards